Duke School may refer to:
 Dukes Middle School, formerly Dukes Grammar School (Alnwick, Northumberland) England
 Duke School (Durham, North Carolina) USA
 Duke University (Durham, North Carolina) USA
 Schools in East Duke, Oklahoma USA